Devin Britton and Austin Krajicek were the defending champions but Britton decided not to participate.
Krajicek partnered with Tennys Sandgren, but lost in the final to the British pairing of Edward Corrie and  Daniel Smethurst 7–6(7–5), 0–6, [10–7].

Seeds

Draw

Draw

References
 Main Draw
 Qualifying Draw

JSM Challenger of Champaign-Urbana - Doubles
2013 Doubles